
Brzesko County is a unit of territorial administration and local government (powiat) in Lesser Poland Voivodeship, southern Poland. It came into being on January 1, 1999, as a result of the Polish local government reforms passed in 1998.

As of 2019 its total population is 93,139, out of which the population of Brzesko is 16,792, that of Czchów is 2,345, and the rural population is 74,002.

Neighbouring counties
Brzesko County is bordered by Tarnów County to the east, Nowy Sącz County and Limanowa County to the south, Bochnia County to the west, and Proszowice County to the north-west.

Administrative division
The county is subdivided into seven gminas (two urban-rural and five rural). These are listed in the following table, in descending order of population.

References

 
Brzesko